Contour may refer to:

 Contour (linguistics), a phonetic sound
 Pitch contour
 Contour (camera system), a 3D digital camera system
 Contour, the KDE Plasma 4 interface for tablet devices
 Contour line, a curve along which the function has a constant value
 Contour drawing, an artistic technique
 A closed path in the mathematical method of contour integration 
 Boundary (topology) of a set

Contours may refer to:
 Contours (album), by Sam Rivers
 The Contours, a soul music group

Contouring may refer to:
 The makeup technique contouring

Other uses
 Ford Contour, a motor car
 CONTOUR, a failed NASA space probe
 Contour, a North Wing Apache ultralight aircraft variant

See also
 Contour fort, a type of British Iron Age hillfort